Vincent Raymond Dunne (17 April 1889 – 17 February 1970), also known as Vincent R. Dunne or Ray Dunne, was an American Trotskyist, teamster, lumberjack, and union organizer with the Industrial Workers of the World and the International Brotherhood of Teamsters. He is notable for his leading role in the 1934 Minneapolis general strike, his conviction and imprisonment under the anti-communist Smith Act, and his membership in the Socialist Workers Party and opposition to Stalinism.

Early life

Dunne was born in Kansas City in 1889, the second of nine children. His mother was the daughter of a Wisconsin shoemaker and his father, a migrant worker from County Clare, Ireland, worked as a repairman for the local street railway. Tragedy struck early in his life when his father broke his kneecap on the job and his mother was forced to move him and his older brother to a farm by where her parents had settled near Little Falls, Minnesota, where they were eventually joined by his father after he had recovered. Adding to their hardships, their cabin burned down one winter when Dunne was six or seven, but they were able to rebuild with the help of neighbors. His father began to work again, this time as a lumberjack and building railway lines. By then, Dunne himself was working for pay on neighboring farms driving teams of horses and working the threshing rigs.

By fourteen, Dunne would leave home to work at lumber camps throughout Minnesota, in conditions he found deplorable. Moving further west the next year, he harvested grain in North Dakota. In 1905, he would go even further west to Montana, where he encountered the Industrial Workers of the World (IWW) in lumber camps. Dunne was immediately struck by the difference in conditions between the union lumber camps and the non-union camps back in Minnesota, finding the bunkhouses spacious, comfortable, and hygienic. The union also proved a source for cheap literature, which Dunne, who had been forced to leave school to work after only five years, enthusiastically embraced, reading titles like Charles Darwin's On the Origin of Species.

During the Panic of 1907, large numbers of workers were laid off and Dunne, along with fellow workers of the IWW, travelled west to Seattle looking for jobs, eventually finding themselves living in large camps of unemployed workers, where they began soapboxing to campaign for jobs and aid to be provided to the unemployed. Eventually, a state road-building project was commissioned to provide jobs for some of the unemployed, but Dunne himself would travel south to California, where in Los Angeles he was sentenced to a road construction chain gang that helped to build Sunset Boulevard. He moved on to Louisiana, where he helped to organize a strike among sawmill workers. The strike failed, but would lay the groundwork for the creation of the multiracial Brotherhood of Timber Workers. After a brief stint in Texas, Dunne would finally move to Minneapolis, which was a major IWW stronghold at the time.

Once established in Minneapolis, Dunne began organizing teamsters with the IWW after becoming frustrated with the conservatism of the American Federation of Labor (AFL). In 1914, he married his wife, Jennie. By the late 1910s, Dunne had drifted away from the IWW's organizing and more toward campaigning for Eugene V. Debs and his Socialist Party of America. The break was solidified after the Russian Revolution, when Dunne officially joined the Communist Party of America. This situation would last for almost 10 years before, in 1928, Dunne became a victim of the "Factional War", when members of the party who opposed Joseph Stalin and supported the theses of Leon Trotsky were purged. Unfazed, Dunne and his comrades formed the Communist League of America (later renamed the Socialist Workers Party) in alignment with Trotsky's Left Opposition to Stalinism. Dunne was a vocal critic of the Communist Party after the expulsion of the Left Opposition, especially regarding Communist Party "raids" on Communist League-controlled front organizations and co-operative businesses.

International Brotherhood of Teamsters

By 1934, Dunne had been organizing teamsters in Minneapolis for twenty-five years and was called "the most effective labor leader in America" by Trotsky. With his brothers Miles and Grant, he took effective leadership of Teamsters Local 574 and knew "four or five hundred workers in Minneapolis [...] personally." During the strike, Dunne and his brothers dealt with espionage from police and private detectives, as well as personal attacks from local newspapers. Nevertheless, the strike would eventually succeed and teamster membership in Minneapolis grew explosively.

Dunne's fate would change by the 1940s, however. Red baiting in the newspapers in 1934 could be deflected, but with American society in the grips of the Second Red Scare, the Socialist Workers Party would find their offices raided and leading officials, including Dunne, accused of sedition under the anti-communist Smith Act. This was seen by Trotskyists as an anti-communist conspiracy between the FBI and Teamsters national leadership, represented by Daniel J. Tobin, who sought to eliminate the leadership of the radical Minneapolis local. Dunne and the other SWP leadership were found guilty, and in 1943 he was imprisoned for sixteen months in the Sandstone federal prison along with other leading American Trotskyists such as James P. Cannon.

Later life

After his release from prison, Dunne would unsuccessfully run for mayor of Minneapolis in 1943 and 1947, and would go on three national speaking tours, as well as serving as a long-time chairman of the Socialist Workers Party in Minnesota. His later life was marked by his fierce opposition to the Vietnam War. He died in 1970.

References

External link
 Vincent R. Dunne Archive at marxists.org

1889 births
1970 deaths
People from Kansas City, Kansas
American Trotskyists
Industrial Workers of the World members
Members of the Socialist Party of America
Socialist Workers Party (United States) politicians
Members of the Communist League of America
Members of the Socialist Workers Party (United States)
American anti-war activists
People convicted under the Smith Act
Minnesota_socialists
Trade unionists from Minnesota
American people of Irish descent